Ivan Zinonovych Fedyk (born 9 July 1987) is a Ukrainian football manager.

Career
Fedyk was born in Drohobych, in the Ukrainian SSR of the Soviet Union - in present-day Ukraine. Before starting his coaching career Fedyk studied at the Lviv State University of Physical Culture and was a sports journalist of newspaper "Sportyvka".

On 15 June 2020, Fedyk made his debut as a manager (head coach) after being appointed to the position of the Ukrainian First League (second tier) FC Rukh Lviv. The more experienced coach Myron Markevych joint him as a consultant.

References

External links

1987 births
Living people
People from Drohobych
Ukrainian football managers
Ukrainian expatriate football managers
Expatriate football managers in Russia
Ukrainian expatriate sportspeople in Russia
FC Rukh Lviv managers
Ukrainian Premier League managers
Ukrainian First League managers
Sportspeople from Lviv Oblast